Chalise Catayas Baysa (born 30 December 1980) is an American-born Filipino football manager and former player. She has played for the Seattle Sounders Women as well as the Philippines women's national team.

Early life
Baysa was born on 30 December 1980 at the Kapiolani Hospital in Honolulu, Hawaii but she spent her childhood in Japan, and later in Washington.

Collegiate career
She attended the University of Oregon where she played for the Ducks soccer team. By October 2001, Baysa was already Oregon's all-time highest scorer with 60 goals.

Club career
By 2008, Baysa was on her fifth season with the Seattle Sounders Women.

International career
Baysa made three caps and a goal for the Philippines women's national football team at the 2013 AFF Women's Championship. She is part of the final line up of the Philippine national team that will participate at the 2018 AFC Women's Asian Cup in Jordan. She is the oldest registered player in the whole tournament at age 37.

International goals

Coaching career
Baysa is a holder of a USSF National "A" License.

References

Seattle Sounders Women players
1980 births
Living people
American women's soccer players
Filipino women's footballers
Philippines women's international footballers
American sportspeople of Filipino descent
Citizens of the Philippines through descent
Oregon Ducks women's soccer players
Soccer players from Honolulu
Women's association football forwards